Tasmannia xerophila, commonly known as alpine pepperbush, is a shrub of eucalypt forest, alpine grassland and rocky terrain of New South Wales and Victoria, Australia.

Leaves are thick, oblanceolate, 1–6 cm long, 5–15 mm wide, glabrous, green on both surfaces. Flowers are white to yellow, 1 cm wide. Black globose berries are 5–10 mm long.

There are two subspecies:
 Tasmannia xerophila subsp. xerophila
 Tasmannia xerophila subsp. robusta

See also
List of Australian herbs and spices

References

Bushfood
Flora of New South Wales
Flora of Victoria (Australia)
Magnoliids of Australia
xerophila